Aanpavam is a 2012 Tamil-language soap opera that aired on Sun TV from February 2012 to 15 June 2012 during weekdays. The Show Directed by V.P. Arunachalam and produced under Sathya Jyothi Films by T.G. Thyagarajan. The show started to re-telecast on Jaya TV from 30 January 2023 Monday to Saturday 5:30PM–6:00PM

Plot 
The story revolves around the family of the couple Gopalswamy and Mahalakshmi and their four sons and the problems they face in their lives.

Cast

Main
 Rajesh as Gopalswamy
 Meera Krishnan as Mahalakshmi

Recurring
 Indraja
 Barath Kalyan
 Raaj Kamal
 Venkat
Mahalakshmi
 Satish Kumar as Cheenu a.k.a. Srinivasan
 Aishwarya
 Jayshree
 Magi
 Gowri
 Lakshmi
 Karthika
 Sujibala
 Ramya
 Tamiz Mani
 Bombay Babu
 Paandi

Production

Casting
In this serial Rajesh and Meera Krishnan are playing the role as father and mother; Barath Kalyan, Raaj Kamal, Venkat, Satish are the sons. Pairing with them are Indraja, Jayshree, Gowri, Lakshmi, Ishwarya. Others who play important roles are Tamiz Mani, Bombay Babu, Suji Bala, Paandi, Magima.

References

External links
 

Sun TV original programming
2012 Tamil-language television series debuts
Television shows set in Tamil Nadu
Tamil-language melodrama television series
Tamil-language television shows
2012 Tamil-language television series endings